Muddy Peak is the second tallest summit in the Muddy Mountains in Clark County, Nevada.

External links
 Muddy Peak, Nevada; Prominence: ; Elevation:  from peakbagger.com accessed December 24, 2016]

References

Mountains of Clark County, Nevada
Mountains of Nevada
Muddy Mountains